This is a list of hilltowns in central Italy.

Tuscany
Anghiari
Barga
Buonconvento
Castelfranco di Sopra
Cetona
Coreglia Antelminelli
Giglio Castello
Pitigliano
Poppi
San Casciano dei Bagni
San Gimignano
Scarperia
Sovana
Suvereto
Volterra
 Marche
Corinaldo
Esanatoglia
Gradara
Montefiore dell'Aso
Montelupone
Moresco
San Ginesio
Visso
 Umbria
Bevagna
Castiglione del Lago
Corciano
Montefalco
Montone
Norcia
Orvieto
Paciano
Todi
Trevi
Vallo di Nera
Lazio
Campodimele
Castel di Tora
Castel Gandolfo
Ceri
Civita di Bagnoregio
Collalto Sabino
Maenza
Priverno
Roccagorga
San Donato Val di Comino
Sperlonga
Abruzzo
Anversa degli Abruzzi
Castel del Monte
Castelli
Castrovalva (Abruzzi)
Guardiagrele
Introdacqua
Pacentro
Pescocostanzo
Pettorano sul Gizio
Pietracamela
Roccascalegna
Santo Stefano di Sessanio
Scanno
Tagliacozzo
Molise

Italy geography-related lists